Sidão is the nickname of Sidnei dos Santos Júnior (born 1982), a Brazilian volleyball player.

Sidao may also refer to:
 Jia Sidao (1213–1275), chancellor during the late Song dynasty of China
 Lu Sidao (531–582), Chinese poet of the Sui dynasty
 Sidão (footballer), the nickname of Sidney Aparecido Ramos da Silva, Brazilian footballer